Whipped Cream & Other Delights is a 1965 album by Herb Alpert & the Tijuana Brass, called "Herb Alpert's Tijuana Brass" for this album, released on A&M Records. It is the band's fourth full album and arguably their most popular release.

This album saw the band nearly abandoning its Mexican-themed music, featuring mostly instrumental arrangements of popular songs, and also generating some major pop hits for the first time since "The Lonely Bull". One "tradition" of the early Brass was to include a number rendered in "strip-tease" fashion, and this album's entry for that style was "Love Potion No. 9".

Track listing
Side 1
"A Taste of Honey" (Bobby Scott, Ric Marlow)  – 2:43
"Green Peppers" (Sol Lake)  – 1:31
"Tangerine" (Johnny Mercer, Victor Schertzinger)  – 2:46
"Bittersweet Samba" (Sol Lake)  – 1:46
"Lemon Tree" (Will Holt)  – 2:23
"Whipped Cream" (Naomi Neville)  – 2:33
Side 2
"Love Potion No. 9" (Jerry Leiber and Mike Stoller)  – 3:02
"El Garbanzo" (Sol Lake)  – 2:13
"Ladyfingers" (Toots Thielemans)  – 2:43
"Butterball" (Mike Henderson)  – 2:12
"Peanuts" (Luis Guerrero)  – 2:09
"Lollipops and Roses" (Tony Velona)  – 2:27

2005 CD reissue bonus tracks
"Rosemary" (Unused Studio Track) (Herb Alpert)
"Blueberry Park" (Unused Studio Track) (Herb Alpert)

Influence

Whipped Cream & Other Delights sold over 6 million copies in the United States and the album cover alone is considered a classic pop culture icon. It featured model Dolores Erickson wearing chiffon and shaving cream. The picture was taken at a time when Erickson was three months pregnant. The album cover was so popular with Alpert fans that, during concerts, when about to play the song "Whipped Cream," Alpert would jokingly tell the audience, "Sorry, we can't play the album cover for you!"

The art was parodied by several groups including once A&M band Soul Asylum, who made fun of the liner notes along with the back cover on their 1989 EP Clam Dip & Other Delights, comedian Pat Cooper on his album Spaghetti Sauce and Other Delights, the Frivolous Five on the Herb Alpert tribute album Sour Cream and Other Delights, Cherry Capri and The Martini Kings' 2006 Creamy Cocktails and Other Delights, Dave Lewis on his 1966 album Dave Lewis Plays Herb Alpert & The Tijuana Brass, Peter Nero on his album Peter Nero Plays a Salute to Herb Alpert & The Tijuana Brass, and metal musician Dante Diablo on his EP Blood, Gore, & Other Delights due in 2021.

Singles taken from the album included "A Taste of Honey," "Whipped Cream" and "Lollipops and Roses". The latter two of these were eventually featured on the ABC-TV series The Dating Game: "Whipped Cream" as the intro to the bachelorette, and "Lollipops and Roses" as the theme used when the bachelor(ette) learned about the person chosen for the date. "Spanish Flea", a song taken from the TJB's next album Going Places, was used as the theme for the bachelor.

Up until this album, Alpert had used Los Angeles area studio musicians to back him on his records. On this album, eventual members of the Tijuana Brass (John Pisano, guitar and Bob Edmondson, trombone) were featured as well as elite session musicians from the Wrecking Crew: Hal Blaine (drums), Carol Kaye (electric bass), Chuck Berghofer (double bass), and Russell Bridges (who would later become famous in his own right as Leon Russell). With the success of Whipped Cream & Other Delights came huge demands for concert appearances.  It was at this time that Alpert formed the public version of the Tijuana Brass which included: Pisano, Edmondson, Nick Ceroli (drums), Pat Senatore (bass), Tonni Kalash (trumpet), Lou Pagani (piano) as well as Julius Wechter on marimba and vibes (studio only).

A remix of the album was released in 2006 on the Shout Factory label with model Bree Condon "clothed" on the cover in a similar fashion to the original.

The album is seen briefly in the movie The Big Lebowski when the Dude is looking through Maude's record collection. It is also seen in The Boondock Saints when Rocco frantically gathers his possessions after killing three associates in a diner. It is seen among other period albums early in The Honeymoon Killers, and can also be spotted in the living room of the Weir household in multiple episodes of Freaks and Geeks.

Chart positions

References

1965 albums
Herb Alpert albums
A&M Records albums
Albums produced by Jerry Moss
Albums produced by Herb Alpert
Albums recorded at Gold Star Studios